The Rhodesian Brushstroke is a brushstroke-type camouflage pattern used by the Rhodesian Security Forces from 1965 until its replacement by a vertical lizard stripe in 1980. 

It was the default camouflage appearing on battledress of the Rhodesian Army and British South Africa Police, although used in smaller quantities by INTAF personnel. The design was also used on uniforms issued to South African Special Forces for clandestine operations. A similar pattern is fielded by the Zimbabwe National Army.

Development and history
Rhodesian Brushstroke consists of large, contrasting, shapes tailored to break up the outline of an object. Like most disruptive camouflage, the pattern is dependent on countershading, utilising hues with high-intensity contrast or noticeable differences in chromaticity.

Prior to Rhodesia's Unilateral Declaration of Independence, enlisted personnel in the Rhodesian Army were issued with uniforms in khaki drill. The Battle of Sinoia and the outbreak of the Rhodesian Bush War prompted the security forces to devise a more appropriate uniform especially designed for the region. 

This incorporated a three colour, high contrast, disruptive fabric with green and brown strokes on a sandy background. Early shortages of textile and equipment were overcome with South African and Portuguese technical assistance, and a home industry for the new battledress developed. 

The pattern was supposedly designed by Di Cameron of David Whitehead Textiles.

Users

Rhodesia

The basic Rhodesian military battledress adopted universally between 1964 and 1966 consisted of a camouflage jacket, field cap, and trousers with wide belt loops for a stable belt and large cargo pockets. Ranks, name tapes, or unit patches were sewn on. In 1969, the jackets were largely superseded by shirts of a lighter material for combat operations in the hot African climate. Late in the bush war, Rhodesian battledress commonly took the form of one-piece coveralls, but uniform regulations remained quite lax in the field. Individual servicemen often modified their uniforms to shorten the sleeves while others wore privately purchased T-shirts with the same camouflage print. The long camouflage trousers were also discarded in large numbers in favour of running shorts.

While the brushstroke pattern itself was considered very effective, the fabric in locally-made uniforms was of poor quality and the Rhodesian troops frequently envied foreign volunteers who brought their more durable foreign-produced clothing with them.

Zimbabwe

The Zimbabwe Defence Forces initially discarded its preexisting stocks of Rhodesian battledress in favour of a Portuguese-designed vertical lizardstripe during the 1980s; however, the original brushstroke pattern was re-adopted during the 1990s just prior to the Second Congo War. Zimbabwe currently produces military uniforms in two variations of Rhodesian Brushstroke designed for the dry season and rainy season, respectively. The dry season variant utilises a light khaki base while the rainy season variant is designed on a green base. The difference between the original Rhodesian camouflage and the ZNA version is that in the Zimbabwe pattern, brown is printed over the green, and not beneath it.

South Africa

During the late 1970s, South African pilots, technical personnel, and special forces frequently operated alongside the Rhodesian security forces. Due to the covert nature of their presence, they were forbidden from wearing their regulation uniforms and instead issued with Rhodesian battledress. South African units known to have received stocks of Rhodesian uniforms included 3 South African Infantry Battalion and 1 Parachute Battalion. South African special forces also wore Rhodesian battledress during raids in Mozambique during the Mozambican Civil War. This practice was largely discontinued following Zimbabwean independence in 1980. The Rhodesian battledress did continue to be issued to ex-Rhodesian service members serving with South African special forces units operating in Zimbabwe between 1981 and 1984.

Non-State actors
Pilfered Rhodesian fatigues occasionally turned up in the hands of the Zimbabwe People's Revolutionary Army (ZIPRA), which used it to impersonate members of the Rhodesian security forces. Prior to standardising its uniforms during the mid 1970s, the People's Armed Forces for the Liberation of Angola (FAPLA) also adopted Rhodesian battledress uniforms in limited quantities.

Trials
While developing a new disruptive camouflage pattern in the 2000, the United States Marine Corps (USMC) evaluated Rhodesian Brushstroke as one of the three best military camouflage patterns previously developed, along with Canadian Pattern (CADPAT) and tigerstripe. None of the three patterns were adopted because the USMC desired a more distinctive design. In 2002, it adopted the MARPAT digital camouflage pattern, a re-coloured version of CADPAT.

See also
Lizard (camouflage)

References

Bibliography

 

1965 clothing
Camouflage patterns
Military camouflage
Military of Rhodesia
Military of Zimbabwe
Military uniforms
Military equipment introduced in the 1960s